Irmak is a village in the Yahşihan district of Kırıkkale Province in Turkey. As of 2016, the village has a population of 1,171, which has been in decline since at least 2013.

Irmak is most notable for the railway junction located just north of the village. TCDD Taşımacılık operates two trains that stop at Irmak railway station. Once construction of the Başkentray commuter rail system in Ankara is complete, more trains will service the station. The D.200 state highway bypasses the village along its southern perimeter.

References

Populated places in Kırıkkale Province